The Bees may refer to:

Sports
 Barnet F.C., an English football club 
 Boston Bees, the 1936–1941 name of the Boston (later Atlanta) Braves Major League Baseball franchise
 Bracknell Bees, an English ice hockey team
 Brentford F.C., an English football club 
 Burlington Bees, a Class A minor league baseball team
 Coventry Bees, an English motorcycle speedway team
 New Britain Bees, a baseball team
 Salt Lake Bees, a minor league baseball team of the Pacific Coast League
 Werribee Football Club, an Australian rules football club often unofficially referred to as the Bees

Bands
 The Bees (band), an indie group from the Isle of Wight, known in the US as A Band of Bees
 The Bees (American band), a 1960s garage rock band
 The Silver Seas, a Nashville band formerly called The Bees

Other uses
 The Bees Army, an opposition movement is Saudi Arabia.
 The Bees (film), the 1978 film
 Las Abejas, a Mexican pacifist civil society organization 
 The Bees, a collection of writings associated with the Sarmoung Brotherhood, a Sufi order
 The Bees, a 2014 novel by Laline Paull

See also
 Bob Bees (born 1972), American football player
 Bee (disambiguation)